Wilfried Hilker (born 13 August 1930 in Ahlen) is a former football referee from Germany.

Hilker was a referee for the German Football Association between 1964 and 1978. He refereed 81 games in the Fußball-Bundesliga and 36 games in the 2. Fußball-Bundesliga in this time and was also in charge of two international matches, five European Cup games and six games in Turkey and Greece.

During his career, Bochum-based Hilker only ever produced the red card twice.

References

External links
 Profile at worldfootball.net

1930 births
Living people
People from Ahlen
Sportspeople from Münster (region)
German football referees
20th-century German people